Alexander James Denny (born 12 April 2000) is an English professional footballer who plays as a defensive midfielder. He last played for The New Saints.

Club career
On 6 December 2017, Denny was named in Everton's first team squad for the Europa League match away to Apollon Limassol. A day later, he made his first-team debut, coming on as a 91st-minute substitute in a 3–0 win.

In the summer of 2020 he joined Salford City as a member of their development squad.  He made his competitive debut for the club on 9 September 2020 in a EFL Trophy game against Manchester United Under-21s.

On 1 February 2021, Denny joined League Two side Morecambe on loan for the remainder of the 2020–21 season.

On 11 January 2022, Denny signed for Cymru Premier side The New Saints. He was not offered a new contract at the end of the season.

International career
Denny has made numerous appearances for England U17, making his debut against Croatia U17 in September 2016. Denny also played in the 2017 under-17 European Championship for England who reached the final, he started in the semi final and final.

Denny also featured five times for England U18s.

Career statistics

Club

Honours
England U17 
UEFA European Under-17 Championship runner-up: 2017
Everton U23s

 Premier League Cup: 2018–19
The New Saints

 Cymru Premier: 2021–22

References

External links

2000 births
Living people
English footballers
England youth international footballers
Association football midfielders
Everton F.C. players
Salford City F.C. players
Morecambe F.C. players
The New Saints F.C. players
English Football League players